A hurdle model is a class of statistical models where a random variable is modelled using two parts, the first which is the probability of attaining value 0, and the second part models the probability of the non-zero values. The use of hurdle models are often motivated by an excess of zero's in the data, that is not sufficiently accounted for in more standard statistical models.

In a hurdle model, a random variable x is modelled as

where  is a truncated probability distribution function, truncated at 0.

Hurdle models were introduced by John G. Cragg in 1971, where the non-zero values of x were modelled using a normal model, and a probit model was used to model the zeros. The probit part of the model was said to model the presence of "hurdles" that must be overcome for the values of x to attain non-zero values, hence the designation hurdle model. Hurdle models were later developed for count data, with Poisson, geometric, and negative binomial models for the non-zero counts .

Relationship with zero-inflated models 
Hurdle models differ from zero-inflated models in that zero-inflated models model the zeros using a two-component mixture model. With a mixture model, the probability of the variable being zero is determined by both the main distribution and the mixture weight. Specifically, a zero-inflated model for a random variable x is

where  is the mixture weight that determines the amount of zero-inflation.

See also 
 Zero-inflated model
 Truncated normal hurdle model

References

Statistical models